Miss World America 1980 was the 3rd edition of the Miss World America pageant and it was held in Studio 54 in New York City, New York and was won by Brooke Alexander of Hawaii. She was crowned by outgoing titleholder, Carter Wilson of Virginia. Alexander went on to represent the United States at the Miss World 1980 Pageant in London later that year. She finished as 6th Runner-Up at Miss World.

Results

Placements

Delegates
The Miss World America 1980 delegates were:

 Alabama - Joanne Henderson
 Alaska - Gay Nel Wilson
 Arizona - Liz Van Houten
 Arkansas - Kim Ferguson
 California - Kelly Bailey
 Colorado - Donna O’Dell
 Connecticut - Marie Beach
 Delaware - Patrice Boyle
 District of Columbia - Cynthia Yoscak
 Florida -  Lisa Marie Smith
 Georgia - Kimberly Byrd
 Hawaii - Brooke Alexander
 Idaho - Janene Stuart
 Illinois - Annette Marroquin
 Indiana - Julie Like
 Iowa - Kay Lawson
 Kansas - Suzanne Harness
 Kentucky - Dee Anne Ennis
 Louisiana - Lisa Thompson
 Maine - Nadine Greenlaw
 Maryland - Lori Estep
 Massachusetts - Nerine Kidd
 Michigan - Diane Marie Arabia
 Minnesota - Lori Swenson
 Mississippi - Karen Davis
 Missouri - Sally Hampton
 Montana - Jurrette Sindler
 Nebraska - Lori Muehlich
 Nevada - Valerie Valow
 New Hampshire - Debra Peltonovich
 New Jersey - Patricia Charlene La Terra
 New Mexico - Penny Beeson
 New York - Patty Blanchfield
 North Carolina - Monica Boston
 North Dakota - Jill Indergaard
 Ohio - Nancy J. Stepien
 Oklahoma - Kathy Ecker
 Oregon - Shari Miner
 Pennsylvania - Christine LaBrasca
 Rhode Island - Sharon McGarry
 South Carolina - Donna Rice
 South Dakota - Lori Sweere
 Tennessee - Suzanna Timberlake
 Texas - Sharri Gorrell
 Utah - Michelle Linford
 Vermont - Yvonne West
 Virginia - Cathy Bohannon
 Washington - Kellie Colleen Jones
 West Virginia - Tammera Lord
 Wisconsin - Debbie Riedel
 Wyoming - Pollie Ostlund

Notes

Returns
Last competed in 1978:

Crossovers
Contestants who competed in other beauty pageants:

Miss USA
1978: : Sharon McGarry
1978: : Suzanna Timberlake
1981: : Joanne Henderson
1982: : Lisa Marie Smith
1982: : Lori Estep (as )
1982: : Diane Marie Arabia

Miss World America
1978: : Gay Nel Wilson
1979: : Debbie Riedel

References

External links
Miss World Official Website
Miss World America Official Website

World America
1980
1980 in New York City
1980s in Manhattan
Studio 54